Located in Worcester, Massachusetts, the Massachusetts Academy of Math and Science at WPI (Mass Academy/MAMS) was founded in 1992 by the Massachusetts State Legislature as a public, non-residential magnet school to serve academically advanced youth in grades eleven and twelve in math, science, and technology.

The school emphasizes math and science within a comprehensive, interactive program. The rigor of the junior year classes exceeds high school honors and AP, with more than 1200 hours of instruction. Seniors complete a year of college, taking the same classes as other students at Worcester Polytechnic Institute. WPI is a nationally ranked engineering school, thus making the Academy the only public school in Massachusetts whose students attend a university full-time as seniors in high school. The Academy was originally located in the sub-basement of WPI's library, but is now located nearby at 85 Prescott Street, near the WPI bioengineering complex.

The Academy is a collaborative effort among the Commonwealth of Massachusetts, Worcester Polytechnic Institute, and the high schools of Massachusetts. In addition to passing all classes, the Academy also requires that all students complete 50 hours of community service per year.

In October 2018, Niche.com selected the Massachusetts Academy of Math and Science as the best public high school in Massachusetts with a student-teacher ratio of 14:1, a diversity grade of A, and a college prep grade of A+.

Admissions 

Students who want to attend the Academy must apply in the sophomore year of high school, although some exceptions have been made.  For example, an occasional freshman has entered the Academy in what would have been his/her sophomore year at their "sending" school. Other times, high school juniors have elected to repeat their eleventh grade at the Academy.

The admissions process is very selective. Grades, teacher recommendations, personal essays, and the academy exam serve as the primary indicators of student ability and motivation.

In 1992, the requirements for entry into the academy required a minimum of 1 year advanced in math and/or science and 2 years ahead in one of the subjects. The admissions process has been changed to the above so this is no longer required; however, only 1/6 of the self-selected group of applicants are offered admission.

The Academy encourages students who wish to attend to visit the school for a day.  These visitors, called "shadows," follow a host student so as to experience a typical day.

Junior year 

Junior year students attend classes from 7:45 a.m. until 2:45 p.m, followed by extracurricular activities until 4 PM. Mandatory classes include Mathematical Modeling, Physics, Humanities, Computer Science, STEM (Science Technology Engineering and Math), Science and Technical Writing, and Foreign Language. STEM I is a class in which students take on an original research investigation that makes some contribution in that field. Students can either conduct science, math or engineering projects. This class culminates with a science fair in February. STEM II is an engineering class in which students work in three- and four-person teams to develop a piece of assistive technology.  These projects are designed with a specific client in mind, usually a young student with a physical handicap. The foreign language classes are also different from most schools. In addition to grammar and translation, the class period consists of making a movie completely in either Spanish or French, singing songs written in foreign language, and discussion in the target language. Two days a week after school students participate in 1.5 hour elective periods, where students can take a class of their choosing. The electives offered each term differ, but have included social dancing, cooking, machine shop, bowling, film appreciation, water colors, photography, advanced mathematics, mock trial, speech and debate, FIRST Robotics Competition, kickboxing, puzzles, German, and drama.

The faculty at the Academy consist of Master Teachers and Visiting Scholars. Master Teachers are faculty who return every year, whereas Visiting Scholars typically come with backgrounds in various fields outside education, and develop their teaching skills over the course of a year or two.

"C-term", running from early January to the middle of March, is generally agreed to be by far the most difficult. The "STEM I" projects (formerly STREAM A for Science Technology Research Engineering and Mathematics, and before that, RS for Research Seminar) and papers must be completed in this time span - these involve individual research into areas not typically studied by high-school students, such as heuristics and mechanical design.

Senior year 
During their senior year, students take on a full-time course load at WPI.   There is no tuition charged to the student. Each term students take one math class, one science class, and one humanities class for a total of twelve courses in 4 terms. In addition, by the end of senior year, each student must complete a senior independent study project. In order to remain in the Academy, students must get a grade of "C" or higher in all 3 A-term classes and in 11 of 12 courses taken at WPI.

Mass Academy has sent students to Harvard University, Cornell University, Brown University, Yale University, Georgia Institute of Technology, Massachusetts Institute of Technology, University of California, Berkeley, McGill University, University of Pennsylvania, Dartmouth College, California Institute of Technology, and many other top schools since its inception in 1992.  Many schools accept all WPI credits, allowing Mass Academy students to graduate a year early.

Benefits from association with WPI 

Because of the association with WPI, Mass Academy students enjoy many amenities offered by WPI. Students at Mass Academy have access to much of what WPI offers. The student center, for example, is a prized social place for Academy students. In the classroom, professors report that Mass Academy seniors tend to be highly engaged class participants and do very well academically. As of 2003, Massachusetts Academy students averaged over 3.0 on a 4-point grading scale, even with the Academy counting "NR" grades as failing "NC" grades.

Mass Academy seniors are issued IDs that can be used as a regular WPI ID to gain access to various WPI facilities including the gym, library, bowling alley, computer labs, and courts.

Mass Academy students, however, are prohibited from joining any sport teams, varsity or club, at WPI. As high school students, NCAA rules make them ineligible for college teams. Students are also prohibited from entering the dormitories at WPI. Any student found in a dormitory will face harsh consequences, which could ultimately lead to an expulsion from the Academy.

Most students graduating from Mass Academy will meet freshmen math requirements in college since three or more terms of calculus is required of everyone. Many students will be eligible to graduate a year early from college because of the year at WPI. Almost all colleges accept credits from WPI, which is ranked 62 on US Newsweek top 100 Universities in the nation.

Student accomplishments 

Mass Academy students have won numerous awards at the state, regional, national, and international levels. Each year at least 10 or 11 Mass Academy students achieve honorable mention, thirds, seconds, and firsts at the Massachusetts State Science Fair. Three have won the prestigious Fish and Richardson Award. Students have also performed well on the annual Math Modeling competition, with some achieving regional outstanding.

While the school is known for its strong math and science program, students who attend the school are also very talented in the humanities. Many students are accomplished musicians with some achieving statewide recognition. Some students have won recognition in national writing contests. The Academy also finished strong in the Massachusetts Envirothon competition for the past several years.

In addition, Mass Academy alumnus, Andy Ross, is in the Grammy award-winning band OK Go.

Expulsion 
A junior who fails the first term may be asked to return to his/her sending school before it is too late so as to avoid damaging the student's high school transcript. The reason for this is that students who do not pass the first term are unlikely to pass the proceeding terms.

Any senior who fails a class during the first term of WPI classes will be asked to return to his/her sending school. A single failure in any other term requires a summer make-up course while two or more failures in any other term leads to a return to the sending school. This is so that students who are unable to handle the college courses are still able to graduate at their sending schools.

References

External links
 Massachusetts Academy of Math and Science at WPI
 Worcester Polytechnic Institute
 

Magnet schools in Massachusetts
NCSSS schools
Schools in Worcester County, Massachusetts
Public high schools in Massachusetts